Cedar Point Provincial Park is a Class C provincial park located on the western end of Quesnel Lake in the Cariboo Region of British Columbia, Canada. As a Class "C" park, it is managed locally by a park board based in the nearby town of Likely. The park was established in 1962 and is approximately 8 hectares in area.

The park features the lake itself and an outdoor museum detailing the history of mining in the area.

External links
BC Parks Website

References

Provincial parks of British Columbia
Geography of the Cariboo
1962 establishments in British Columbia
Protected areas established in 1962